Custom Builder is a trade publication and web site formerly owned by Reed Business Information. It serves the informational needs of firms in the residential building industry.

History and profile
Established in 1991,  the magazine was started with the name Luxury Home Builder and was originally published bimonthly. The magazine was part of Reed Business Information. From January 2006, a seventh issue in April was added to their editorial calendar. Its sister magazine is Professional Builder.

Common topics in the magazine include design ideas, business builder solutions, and innovations. In 2007, Custom Builder posted three webcasts in April, September, and November covering labor issues, green building and customer satisfaction. 

In June 2008, total BPA circulation was 34,145 subscribers.

In 2010 Reed Business Information closed the magazine. It was relaunched by MB Media LLC headed Tony Mancini and Rick Blesi the same year.

References

External links
Custom Builder website

1991 establishments in the United States
Business magazines published in the United States
Magazines established in 1991
Professional and trade magazines
Bimonthly magazines published in the United States
Magazines published in Chicago